The common woodshrike (Tephrodornis pondicerianus) is a species of bird found in Asia. It is now usually considered a member of the family Vangidae. It is small and ashy brown with a dark cheek patch and a broad white brow. It is found across Asia mainly in thin forest and scrub habitats where they hunt insects, often joining other insectivorous birds. The form found in Sri Lanka which was treated as a subspecies is now usually considered a separate species, the Sri Lanka woodshrike.

Description
The common woodshrike is dully ashy brown and like other woodshrikes has a large head with a strong hooked beak. They have a broad creamy brow above a dark cheek patch and white outer tail feathers contrasting with their dark tail. Young birds have streaks and spot on the crown and white spots on the mantle. The underside is also streaked and the breast is heavily marked in young birds. The Sri Lankan species is similar darker on the underside, with the dark cheek bordered below by a buffy sub-moustachial stripe and a white rump.

Taxonomy

The genus name Tephrodornis is derived from the Greek root tephra (τέφρα) which refers to ash, the colour and ornis for bird. The species was described by J.F. Gmelin on the basis of a specimen that came from the Coromandel region, presumably Pondicherry on the basis of which he gave the species name. Claud Ticehurst however restricted the type locality of the nominate subspecies to Madras. He placed it along with the flycatchers in the genus Muscicapa. In the past the species included Tephrodornis affinis as a subspecies but that is now considered a full species restricted within Sri Lanka. The Sri Lankan species has distinct plumage as well as calls. Several subspecies have been named for the populations within the wide range of this species. The northwestern dry region form is paler and given the name of pallidus while the nominate population which has dark central tail feathers is found in peninsular India. The populations in Southeast Asia are placed in orientis.

Behaviour and ecology

Usually found in pairs, they have a loud whistling song made of several notes. The usual call is a plaintive weet-weet followed by a series of quick whi-whi-whi-whee?. They have a loud song consisting of several rapid whistling notes. They feed on mainly on insects and sometimes berries by gleaning mostly along branches and leaves within trees but sometimes also make aerial sallies or descend to the ground. They have a habit of adjusting their wings, raising them over the tail shortly after alighting on a perch. They nest in summer before the rainy season, building a cup nest on a bare fork. The nest is made of fibres and bark held by cobwebs and covered with bits of bark and lichen. It is lined with silky plant fibres. Three eggs are the usual clutch. Both parents incubate but it is thought that only the female feeds the young. Young birds are fed on insects and berries. Two broods may be raised in some years.

A species of Haemoproteus was described from a Goan specimen of this species as Haemoproteus tephrodornis by Froilano de Mello in 1935. A spirurid nematode Oxyspirura alii was described and named after S. Mehdi Ali and obtained from within the eye cavity of a common woodshrike specimen from Hyderabad. Ticks of the species Haemaphysalis bispinosa and H. intermedia have been recorded on the species.

References

External links
 
 Photos, videos and observations at Cornell Lab of Ornithologys Birds of the World
 Calls and songs on the xeno canto collection

common woodshrike
Birds of South Asia
Birds of Southeast Asia
common woodshrike
common woodshrike